Sorell is a town in Tasmania, Australia, north-east of Hobart. It is located on the Tasman Highway at the junction with the Arthur Highway. Sorell is one of Tasmania's oldest towns, being first settled in 1808 as a small farming community and becoming an official township in 1821.

History 
Sorell was named after William Sorell, the third Lieutenant-Governor of Van Diemen's Land.  Historically, it was known as a major town on the route from Hobart to Port Arthur on the Tasman Peninsula. It was the centre of an agricultural area and an important market town. It is now a dormitory town of Hobart, as well as the seat of the Sorell Council.

In 1872 the Sorell Causeway was opened, from the Cambridge direction, across Pitt Water and Orielton Lagoon to Sorell, stopping at Midway Point in the middle. This shortened the route considerably from the original road via Richmond.

Sorell Post Office opened on 1 June 1832.

There is also a mountain in the West Coast Range with the same name. Port Sorell is located on the mid north coast of Tasmania.

Infrastructure
Sorell is served by Sorell School, the oldest continually operating public school in Australia, opened in 1821. It is a co-educational primary and secondary school, serving years K-12. Sorell is served by a Libraries Tasmania library, a Service Tasmania office, and Australia Post Office.

Sorell Plaza shopping center, built in the mid 2000s, provides a supermarket and other major retail outlets. It was purchased by SCA Property Group, a subsidiary of Woolworths, in 2019. Gateway Shopping Center includes a competing supermarket and small retail.

Sorell is served by private bus companies, Tassielink Transit and Redline Coaches.

Sorell falls within the Anglican Parish of South East Tasmania, based at St George's Church, and the Parish of Richmond, with services at St Thomas's Church. Historically, it was also served by the Presbyterian Scots Church, designed by James Blackburn, which is now a private residence.

Sorell has a number of historic buildings, including the Sorell Barracks, constructed to house soldiers during the Black War. These and other historic buildings - including the railway house, the old Sorell Library (now an antiques center), and the Gordon Highlander Hotel, form a heritage walk. The area also has a local historical society as well as a Freemasons Lodge (Lodge Pembroke).

Gallery

References

Towns in Tasmania
East Coast Tasmania
Localities of Sorell Council